The Laymen's Inquiry, Laymen's Report, or Hocking report was produced in 1932 under the leadership of William Ernest Hocking, evaluating American missionary activity in Asia and recommending a change from evangelism to education and social welfare.

History 
In 1930–1932, Harvard Professor William Ernest Hocking led the Commission of Appraisal, which studied the foreign mission work of six mainline Protestant denominations in India, Burma, China, and Japan. Their missionaries had been at work in Asia for a century but now were experiencing falling donations and nationalistic resistance.  The Commission's report, Re-Thinking Missions: A Laymen's Inquiry After One Hundred Years (1932)  reflected changing ideas about the wisdom of a reduced role for western missionaries, which generated fierce debate.

Commission members traveled to Asian cities to meet missionaries and local people. While in China, Hocking consulted with the famous writer Pearl S. Buck, who was developing a similar critique of missions and who threw her support behind the Commission's report.

The Commission recommended a greater emphasis on education and welfare, transfer of power to local groups, less reliance on evangelizing, with respectful appreciation for local religions. A recommended related goal was the transition of local leadership and institutions. The Commission also recommended reorganization in the US to coordinate and focus missionary efforts by creating a single organization for Protestant missions.

References 

1932 in Christianity
Protestant ecumenism
Christian missions in Asia